Sevanaïa Galala (born 29 January 1993 in Fiji) is a Fijian rugby union player who plays for  in the Top 14. His playing position is centre or wing. Galala has represented Brive since 2011. He made his debut for Fiji in 2018 against Samoa.

Reference list

External links
itsrugby.co.uk profile

1993 births
Fijian rugby union players
Fiji international rugby union players
Living people
Rugby union centres
Rugby union wings
CA Brive players